"Little Miss Can't Be Wrong" is a song by American rock group Spin Doctors, released in October 1992 as the lead single from their debut album, Pocket Full of Kryptonite (1991). The song reached number 17 on the US Billboard Hot 100 and number two on the Billboard Album Rock Tracks chart. It also reached number five in New Zealand and ended 1993 as the country's 41st-best-selling single. Live versions of "What Time Is It?" and "Freeway of the Plains" (mistakenly titled "Freeway of Plains" on the single) were included as its B-side.

Background and writing
Lead singer Chris Barron has stated that the song was inspired by his relationship with his stepmother, despite popular belief that it was written about an ex-girlfriend. He described his stepmother as a "malignant narcissist". Barron had a viral tweet in August 2019 about the song's creation, writing: "My stepmom told me I'd be a janitor [nothing wrong with that] and live in the basement of a school and play guitar for the rats. I wrote a song about her. It's called Little Miss Can't Be Wrong. It's been played on the radio three million times."

Lyrically the song is about the narrator glad to be rid of his controlling girlfriend but towards the end the narrator slowly has a change of heart.

Critical reception
An editor from AllMusic described the song as "incessantly catchy". Alan Jones from Music Week rated it three out of five, writing, "This driving, economical song — vaguely reminiscent in execution to some of Steve Miller's material — should win support of rock radio. It may not be a Top 20 hit, but should nibble at the lower end of the chart, and tee up their album A Pocket Full of Kryptonite." Sylvia Patterson from Smash Hits gave the song four out of five, viewing it as "feisty stuff."

Music video
The accompanying music video for "Little Miss Can't Be Wrong" premiered in August 1992.

Track listing

Charts

Weekly charts

Year-end charts

References

Spin Doctors songs
1991 songs
1992 debut singles
Epic Records singles